The first Province No. 1 Provincial Assembly was elected by the 2017 provincial elections. 93 members were elected to the assembly, 56 of whom were elected through direct elections and 37 of whom were elected through the party list proportional representation system. The term of the assembly started on 5 February 2018 and ended in September 2022. Sher Dhan Rai and Bhim Acharya served as chief ministers from CPN (Unified Marxist–Leninist) and Rajendra Kumar Rai served as chief minister from CPN (Unified Socialist) during the term of the assembly. Pradeep Kumar Bhandari served as the speaker of the assembly and Saraswati Pokharel served as deputy speaker.

Composition

Leaders

Office bearers 

 Speaker of the Provincial Assembly: Hon. Pradeep Kumar Bhandari
 Deputy Speaker of the Provincial Assembly: Saraswati Pokharel
Leader of the House (Chief Minister):
 Hon. Sher Dhan Rai (CPN (UML)) (until 26 August 2021)
 Hon. Bhim Acharya (CPN (UML)) (from 26 August 2021 to 1 November 2021)
 Hon. Rajendra Kumar Rai  (CPN (Unified Socialist)) (from 1 November 2021)
 Leader of the Opposition:
 Hon. Rajiv Koirala (Nepali Congress) (until 1 November 2021)
 Hon. Sher Dhan Rai (CPN (UML)) (from 1 November 2021)

Parliamentary Party Leaders 

 Parliamentary Party Leader (CPN (UML)):
 Hon. Sher Dhan Rai (CPN (UML)) (until 26 August 2021)
 Hon. Bhim Acharya (CPN (UML)) (from 26 August 2021 to 1 November 2021)
 Hon. Sher Dhan Rai (from 1 November 2021)
 Parliamentary Party Leader  (Nepali Congress): Rajiv Koirala
 Deputy Parliamentary Party Leader: Himal Karki
 Parliamentary Party Leader (CPN (Maoist Centre)): Indra Bahadur Angbo
 Parliamentary Party Leader (CPN (Unified Socialist)): Rajendra Kumar Rai
 Parliamentary Party Leader (People's Socialist Party, Nepal): Jay Ram Yadav
 Parliamentary Party Leader (Rastriya Prajatantra Party): Indira Rai
 Parliamentary Party Leader (Sanghiya Loktantrik Rastriya Manch): Bishnu Maya Tubahamphe

Whips 

 Chief Whip (CPN (UML)): Buddhi Kumar Rajbhandari
 Chief Whip (Nepali Congress): Kedar Karki
 Whip (Nepali Congress): Suyarma Raj Rai

Members

Defections

Changes

See also 

 Province No. 1
 2017 Nepalese provincial elections

References 

Members of the Provincial Assembly of Koshi Province